Guilhermina Augusta Xavier de Medim Suggia Carteado Mena, known as Guilhermina Suggia, (27 June 1885 – 30 July 1950) was a Portuguese cellist. She studied in Paris, France with Pablo Casals, and built an international reputation. She spent many years living in the United Kingdom, where she was particularly celebrated. She retired in 1939, but emerged from retirement to give concerts in Britain. Her last was in 1949, the year before her death.

Suggia bequeathed an important British scholarship for young cellists, which has been granted to performers including Derek Simpson, who was first holder of the Suggia Scholarship and continued his studies in Paris under Pierre Fournier, Rohan de Saram, Jacqueline du Pré, Robert Cohen and Steven Isserlis.

Biography

Suggia was born in Porto to a family of Portuguese and Italian descent. Her father was a competent musician and taught her musical theory and cello. Such was her progress that by the age of 12 she was appointed principal cellist of the local orchestra, the Orpheon Portuense. In 1904, under the patronage of Queen Maria Amélia of Portugal, she went to study at Leipzig under Julius Klengel. Although Klengel was a professor at the Leipzig Conservatoire, Suggia did not enroll there but rather took private lessons from him

Within a year Suggia was asked to appear as a soloist with the Leipzig Gewandhaus Orchestra under its conductor, Arthur Nikisch. From 1906 to 1912 she lived and worked in Paris with the cellist Pablo Casals. It was generally believed, incorrectly, that the two were married, and Suggia was sometimes billed as "Mme P. Casals-Suggia". She began to tour internationally, building her reputation. She and Casals were rated as "the world's leading cellists". Casals was close friends with composer Donald Tovey, who wrote his Sonata for two cellos for the pair. On visiting the couple to present the work in 1912, an unknown event occurred between Suggia and Tovey which caused strain on the relationship between Suggia and Casals, and the friendship between Tovey and Casals. After they separated, Suggia retained her admiration for Casals, describing him as pre-eminent among living cellists.<ref>Suggia, Guilhermina, "The Violoncello", Music & Letters", April 1920, p. 107</ref>  In 1914 she formed a trio with the violinist Jelly d'Arányi and the pianist Fanny Davies. During the period of her residence in Britain during the 1920s and 1930s, she was a frequent visitor to Lindisfarne Castle in northern England, where a cello now rests in the Music Room in commemoration of her time spent there. Her "Montagnana" cello rests in Conservatório de Música do Porto, her home-town in Portugal.

Edward Hudson,the founder of the British magazine ‘Country Life’ is said to have been infatuated by Guilhermina. He was briefly engaged to her and bought her the aforementioned Montagnana cello and which she is shown playing in the portrait by Augustus John referred to below.
 
In 1927, Suggia married Jose Mena, an X-ray specialist. During World War II, Suggia and her husband returned to Portugal, where she lived in retirement. She visited Britain after the war, giving performances of the Elgar Cello Concerto in aid of charity. She gave her last concerts at the Edinburgh Festival in 1949 and in Bournemouth later the same year.

Suggia died of cancer in Porto at the age of 65, a year after the death of her husband.

Recordings
Suggia made a small number of gramophone recordings. They include Haydn's D major Concerto with John Barbirolli and Saint-Saëns's A minor Concerto with Lawrence Collingwood. They were reissued on compact disc in 1989 (EMI EH761083-1). A compilation CD was released in 2004 with performances of Haydn, Max Bruch and Lalo (Dutton CDBP9748).

Legacy
Suggia bequeathed her Stradivarius cello to the Royal Academy of Music in London, to be sold to fund a scholarship for young cellists. The Suggia Gift, established in 1955, has since 1995 been administered by the Musicians' Benevolent Fund. It has been won by cellists including Rohan de Saram (1955), Jacqueline du Pré (1956–1961), Robert Cohen (1967–1971), Hafliði Hallgrímsson, Steven Isserlis, Raphael Wallfisch and Julian Lloyd Webber. In 2010 it was announced that the 2011 Suggia Gift would be run in association with the 2011 International Guilhermina Suggia Festival, held in her native city.

The large auditorium at Casa da Música in Porto is named Sala Suggia in her honour.

TAP Portugal, national airline, named one of its airplanes, an Airbus A319, after her.

Probably the most famous image of Suggia is the oil portrait by the Welsh artist Augustus John, whose daughter Amaryllis Fleming later became a well-known cellist herself. This picture was commissioned initially by Edward Hudson (see above) and begun in 1920 but not finished till 1923. It was shown at the Carnegie Institute in Pittsburgh in 1924, bought by an American but later returned to England and presented to the Tate Gallery. The painting measures 186 X 165 cm. The Manchester Guardian wrote of this work that it "will serve to remind future generations that here was a musician who matched the nobility of her art with that of her presence on the concert platform." Photographs of Suggia by Alvin Langdon Coburn are held in the George Eastman House Still Photograph Archive and a photographic portrait by Bertram Park is in the National Portrait Gallery in London.

See also
 Adriana de Vecchi

 References 

Further reading
Mercier, Anita (2008). Guilhermina Suggia: Cellist. Ashgate, Guilhermina Suggia ou o violoncello luxuriante.  Or the Luxuriant Violoncello, Fátima Pombo, Fundação Eng. António de Almeida, Porto (1993).  This book is in both Portuguese and in English.  la Suggia : l'autre violoncelliste'', Henri Gourdin, Editions de Paris – Max Chaleil, Paris (2015).

External links
 Guilhermina Suggia, article by Anita Mercier, Professor at Juilliard School
  Tate Gallery – Portrait by Augustus John
 Biography at Centro Virtual Camões 
 House of Guilhermina Suggia in Porto, Rua da Alegria 
 Guilhermina Suggia Association 

Portuguese classical cellists
1885 births
1950 deaths
Musicians from Porto
University of Music and Theatre Leipzig alumni
Women classical cellists
20th-century women musicians
20th-century classical musicians
20th-century Portuguese musicians
20th-century Portuguese women musicians
20th-century cellists
Portuguese people of Italian descent